Thomas Bright Crosse (1796 – 21 March 1886) was a British Conservative politician.

Crosse was elected Conservative Member of Parliament for Wigan at the 1841 general election but was removed on election petition the following year.

References

External links
 

UK MPs 1841–1847
Conservative Party (UK) MPs for English constituencies
1796 births
1886 deaths